Mutawakkil Kazi was a Pakistani civil servant who served in BPS-22 grade as the Planning and Development Secretary of Pakistan and Chief Secretary Sindh. He also served as Cabinet Secretary of Pakistan for a very brief period as his tenure was cut short after the 1999 coup and he was transferred by General Pervez Musharraf.

Education

He gained his masters degree in economics from the Williams College, USA in 1974, and his doctorate in economics from the Boston University in 1985.

Career

He remained in the Prime Minister’s Secretariat during the tenures of prime ministers Moeen Qureshi and Benazir Bhutto. Subsequently he was appointed as Member Planning Commission and Chairman Planning and Development Board Punjab. He was appointed Cabinet Secretary by Prime Minister Mian Muhammmad Nawaz Sharif just a few days before he was ousted from power in 1999. He remained Secretary Ministry of Planning and Development from 2000 till 2003. Subsequently he was Chief Secretary of Sindh in 2003-2004 before reverting to the Federal government as Secretary Industries and Production. After retirement from regular government service he worked as Member of the Federal Public Service Commission till January 2008.

Death

After the end of his constitutional term in the Federal Public Service Commission, Kazi helped several social sector ministries in an advisory capacity through his expertise. He died suddenly on 1 June 2008 due to cardiac arrest.

See also

 Khan Bahadur Ghulam Nabi Kazi
 A G N Kazi
 Mushtak Ali Kazi
 Bashir Ghulam Nabi Kazi
 Allama I. I. Kazi
 Elsa Kazi
 Dr Ali Ahmed S Kazi
 Ahmed Hussain A Kazi
 Sindh
 Boston University
 Planning Commission (Pakistan)

References

1944 births
2008 deaths
Sindhi people
Pakistani civil servants
Pakistani economists
Forman Christian College alumni
People from Karachi